Amy Kane (born 10 September 1986) is an English former football midfielder. She played for Everton Ladies and Blackburn Rovers Ladies, as well as representing England at Under-23 level.

Club career
Kane joined Everton Ladies at the age of 15. She progressed the senior side, scoring the winning goal for them in the shock 2007–08 FA Women's Premier League Cup Final win over Arsenal. When homeless Fara Williams signed for Everton, Kane's family took her in and helped her establish herself. Kane joined Blackburn Rovers Ladies in January 2009 in search of more regular first team football.

She returned to Everton in summer 2010 for the club's UEFA Women's Champions League campaign. When the 2014 campaign ended in Everton's relegation, Kane decided to retire in order to focus on her career away from football.

International career
Kane has represented England at Under-19, Under-21 and Under-23 levels. In April 2007 she was chosen to join the England senior side's training camp at La Manga Club.

She has also represented Great Britain at the World University Games, scoring a hat-trick in four minutes in Great Britain's first group game of the 2009 tournament in Belgrade, a 10–0 win against Estonia.

Personal life
Kane attended Liverpool John Moores University, on the Talented Athlete Scholarship Scheme.

In December 2015 she married former Everton team-mate Fara Williams, but they separated a short time later.

Blackburn Rovers statistics

References

English women's footballers
Everton F.C. (women) players
Women's Super League players
Blackburn Rovers L.F.C. players
1986 births
Living people
FA Women's National League players
England women's under-23 international footballers
Footballers from Liverpool
Lesbian sportswomen
English LGBT sportspeople
LGBT association football players
Women's association football midfielders
Universiade bronze medalists for Great Britain
Universiade medalists in football
Medalists at the 2009 Summer Universiade
21st-century LGBT people